Spirit of Prophecy may refer to:

 Spirit of Prophecy (Latter Day Saints)
 Inspiration of Ellen White#Spirit of prophecy, a term sometimes used by Seventh-day Adventists to refer to the Holy Spirit and to Ellen White and her writings